The 2014–15 Oakland Golden Grizzlies men's basketball team represented Oakland University during the 2014–15 NCAA Division I men's basketball season. The Golden Grizzlies, led by 31st year head coach Greg Kampe, played their home games at the Athletics Center O'rena. This was Oakland's second season in the Horizon League. They finished the season 16–17, 11–5 in Horizon League play to finish in a tie for third place. They lost in the quarterfinals of the Horizon League tournament to UIC. They were invited to the CollegeInsider.com Tournament where they lost in the first round to Eastern Illinois.

2014 recruiting class
The Golden Grizzlies brought in two freshmen from high school detailed in the following table. The Golden Grizzlies also accepted transfer Colin Weaver from North Pointe Preparatory school in Phoenix, Arizona. Weaver has sophomore eligibility.

Preseason

Oakland was picked by coaches, media and sports information directors to finish seventh in their second season in the Horizon League. Senior center Corey Petros was selected to the preseason first team and sophomore point guard Kahlil Felder was selected to the second team.

From the previous season, Oakland lost seniors Travis Bader and Duke Mondy to graduation. Bader finished his college career with the most three-point field goals made in NCAA history. Redshirt freshman Artis Cleveland violated team rules in the offseason and will not return to the team.

Oakland defeated NCAA Division II member Ferris State 94–87 and National Association of Intercollegiate Athletics member Saint Xavier 87–72 in exhibition games prior to the start of the regular season. Both games were played at home at the O'rena.

Season
During the season Oakland announced two players transferred to the school. Guards Martez Walker transferred from the Texas Longhorns men's basketball team and Sherron Dorsey-Walker transferred from Iowa State. Walker withdrew from the University of Texas after he was arrested on charges he assaulted his girlfriend. He is currently a walk-on for the team although that situation may change depending on the outcome of the charges. Dorsey-Walker transferred from Iowa State to be closer to his mother and younger brothers. Both players were high school teammates of Felder.

Roster
The following table lists Oakland's roster as of January 10, 2015.

Schedule

|-
! colspan="9" style="background:#9a803e; color:#000;"| Exhibition

|-
! colspan="9" style="background:#9a803e; color:#000;"| Regular season

|-
! colspan="9" style="background:#9a803e; color:#000;"| 2015 Horizon League Men's Basketball tournament

|-
! colspan="9" style="background:#9a803e; color:#000;"| 2015 CollegeInsider.com Postseason tournament

References

External links
 Official site

Oakland Golden Grizzlies men's basketball seasons
Oakland
Oakland
Oakland
Oakland